Mannen (lit. "The Man") is a mountain in Rauma Municipality in Møre og Romsdal county, Norway. Mannen has a distinctive needle peak. The mountain's shape has been compared to an enormous seated goose that looks out over the Rauma valley, from which it can easily be seen.

Overview
Even a smaller slide of about  could cross the valley floor, potentially devastating buildings and damaging the Rauma Line railway and European route E136. Such an event could also partially or completely dam up the river Rauma, creating major disruption and a flooding hazard.

During the autumn of 2014, observers became aware of an abnormally large shifting of a portion of the mountain. As a precaution, on October 22 several houses potentially in the path of a landslide were evacuated and the Rauma Line stopped its four-times-a-day rail service.

The mountain's slippage was three times as much as the previous night's measurement, and it was the largest motion the observers had seen to date. Geologist Lars Harald Blikra told a news conference that the lower part of the mountain has also increased its rate of motion.

During 19 and 20 September 2015, the upper parts of the mountain began to shift quickly again, moving  in one day.

In September 2018,  of movement was recorded during 24 hours, the highest measured. Various movements from 2014-2018 triggered a "red alert" status, causing the temporary evacuation of nearby residents and railway closures.

On 5 September 2019, a very large landslide took place from Mannen.
After this landslide, some smaller parts among the debris is still unstable but will not cause a large landslide. It was said that it was the correct action to close the railway and evacuate residents at every one of the 16 red alerts, even if the landslide did not damage any house or the railway.

Name
It is common to compare mountains with persons in Norwegian place names.

See also
List of mountains of Norway

References

Landslides in Norway
Mountains of Møre og Romsdal
Rauma, Norway
Intermunicipal companies of Norway